Like a Flame is a double-album with free improvisations for organ by Frederik Magle released in December 2010 on the Swedish record label Proprius Music (PRCD 2061). It was recorded on the then new Frobenius pipe organ in Jørlunde church on December 22–23, 2009. Frederik Magle recorded a total of 60 free improvisations over the course of the two days and later selected 23 to be released on the double album. The improvisations was recorded in one take.

The album has been mostly favorably reviewed, but also been criticized and caused some debate about the nature of improvisation with the reviewers of Danish magazine Orglet and Danish Organist's Society (DOKS) magazine Organistbladet arguing for the use of traditional fugal and choral forms as well as stylistic copies of Johann Sebastian Bach when improvising and on the other hand organist, jazz-pianist, and composer Henrik Sørensen defending the free improvisational form on Like a Flame in an article in Danish organ-magazine Orgelforum.

Origin of the title 

The title of the album (and the title track) is derived from a quote from the Irish poet William Butler Yeats' play The Land of Heart's Desire:

 Faeries, come take me out of this dull world,
 For I would ride with you upon the wind,
 Run on the top of the dishevelled tide,
 And dance upon the mountains like a flame!

Track listing 

CD1:
 Origin
 Like a Flame
 Fleeting Glimpses
 Towards Truth
 A Temptation
 Merry-go-round
 Awakening
 Awake
 To Become
 Realization
 Truth

CD2:
 Odditorium
 Through the Mist
 Crossing Borders
 Dreams of Childhood Dreams
 Memories of Meadows
 Behind the Mask
 Empty Fair
 Lament
 Journey Forever
 Destiny
 Ascending
 End of the Circle

References

2010 classical albums
2010 live albums
Frederik Magle live albums
Live instrumental albums